Markéta Šimková (née Vondroušová; ; born 28 June 1999) is a Czech professional tennis player. She has a career-high ranking of world No. 14 by the Women's Tennis Association (WTA). Vondroušová finished runner-up at the 2019 French Open, where she became the first teenage Grand Slam finalist on the tour since Caroline Wozniacki, nearly a decade earlier. She has won one singles title out of four finals on the WTA Tour and a silver medal at the 2021 Tokyo Olympics.

Vondroušová is a former world No. 1 junior, having won two Grand Slam doubles titles. She had a quick breakthrough on the WTA Tour, winning the 2017 Ladies Open Biel Bienne at the age of 17 in just her second career WTA singles event. This title helped her reach the top 100 of the WTA rankings before turning 18 years old. Vondroušová has struggled with injuries early in her career, most notably missing the second half of the 2019 season shortly after her French Open maiden final.

Her signature shot is the drop shot. She is one of the best returners on the WTA Tour, having led the tour in percentage of return games won and percentage of return points won in 2019 among all players with at least ten matches.

Early life and background
Markéta Vondroušová was born on 28 June 1999 to David Vondrouš and Jindřiška Anderlová in Sokolov, a small town in the Czech Republic near the country's western border with Germany. Her father introduced her to tennis at the age of four, having played the sport recreationally. Her mother played volleyball for SK Slavia Prague in the top-flight Extraliga. Although her parents divorced when Vondroušová was three, both her mother and father as well as her stepfather stayed in her life and supported her growth as a tennis player. When Vondroušová was young, she tried a variety of sports including skiing, football, table tennis, and floorball, excelling in all of these. She began to focus on tennis early on, entering a national mini-tennis tournament on Štvanice island in Prague in 2006. At this tournament, she finished in third place and won qualification to an international tournament in Umag in Croatia, where she lost in the first round but won the consolation bracket as an eight-year-old competing against mostly nine-year-old players.

Following the national tournament in Štvanice, it was arranged for Vondroušová to go back and train there. During this time, she trained for five days a week, two of which were in Štvanice, a few hours from her hometown. She had another big international success at the age of twelve when she won the Nike Junior Tour International Masters in the United States, which was regarded as an unofficial 12-and-under world championship. At the age of 15, she moved to Prague to train more regularly in the capital.

Vondroušová has a strong athletic background from her mother's side of the family. Her grandfather, František Frk, was the Czechoslovak national champion in the pentathlon in 1935.

Junior career
Vondroušová is a former world No. 1 junior. She made her debut on the ITF Junior Circuit at the age of 13 and won both the singles and doubles events at her first tournament, the Grade 5 San Michel International Tournament in Malta in April 2013. Later in the year, she won a higher-level Grade 4 singles event in Poland as well as a separate Grade 2 doubles event in the Czech Republic. Vondroušová made her Grade 1 debut with a singles semifinal in January 2014, which she followed with a second round loss in her debut at the highest-level Grade A tournaments in May. She entered her first junior Grand Slam events in May and had immediate success, reaching the semifinals at both the French Open and Wimbledon. In both tournaments, she lost to the eventual champions Daria Kasatkina and Jeļena Ostapenko respectively. Vondroušová fared better in doubles at the French Open, finishing runner-up to the Romanian team of Ioana Ducu and Ioana Loredana Roșca alongside American CiCi Bellis in a match tiebreak. Despite losing her opening singles matches at her last two Grade A tournaments of the year, the US Open and the Orange Bowl, Vondroušová ended 2014 by winning the Orange Bowl doubles title with Bellis.

Vondroušová continued to have more success in doubles in 2015, most notably winning her only two junior Grand Slam titles and three Grade-A doubles events in total. Although she lost her opening-round match at the Australian Open, she won the doubles title with compatriot Miriam Kolodziejová without dropping a set. Vondroušová did not play another junior event until late May, instead opting to play events on the professional circuit. In her return, she won both the singles and doubles events at the Grade-A Trofeo Bonfiglio, again partnering with Kolodziejová. She defeated Charlotte Robillard-Millette in the singles final for her only career Grade-A singles title. With these titles, Vondroušová became the No. 1 ranked junior in the world for the first time. While she lost in the semifinals at the French Open for the second consecutive year, she won a second Grand Slam doubles title with Kolodziejová, again without losing a set. The semifinal was her best Grand Slam singles result of the year. Vondroušová and Kolodziejová then won a fourth consecutive title at the Grade-1 Junior International Roehampton before their 28-match win streak came to an end in the Wimbledon semifinals, where they were defeated by the Hungarian team of Dalma Gálfi and Fanny Stollár.

Towards the end of the 2015 season, Vondroušová represented the Czech Republic at the Junior Fed Cup with Monika Kilnarová and Anna Slováková. She won all eight of her rubbers and led the Czech team to the title with a 2–1 victory over US team of Kayla Day and Claire Liu, in the final. Vondroušová only played one junior tournament in 2016, losing in the third round in singles at the French Open.

Professional career

2014–17: WTA debut and maiden title at 17, top and Major 100 debut

Vondroušová began playing on the ITF Women's Circuit in May 2014 at the age of 14, and qualified for her first main draw later in the year. She reached her first singles final at the lowest $10k level in March 2015 at Sharm El Sheikh, where she won the doubles event for her first professional title. Her first and second singles title came in May and June respectively. Vondroušová made her WTA Tour main-draw doubles debut in April 2015 at the Prague Open, losing her opening match alongside Kateřina Vaňková. She made her WTA Tour singles debut at the same tournament a year later, winning her first career match against Océane Dodin before losing to eventual runner-up Samantha Stosur. Vondroušová did not enter any more events after May 2016 due to a left elbow injury.

Vondroušová returned to the tour in January 2017 and won her first two ITF singles events back followed by two more runner-up finishes in her third and fifth events. This success helped her break into the top 300 for the first time by the end of February.

At the Ladies Open Biel Bienne in April, Vondroušová had her first big breakthrough. She won her maiden WTA Tour title at the age of 17 in just her second career WTA singles event. After entering the main draw through qualifying, she upset top seed and world No. 18, Barbora Strýcová, in the semifinals. She then defeated Anett Kontaveit in the final. With the title, she rose to No. 117 in the world. Having started the tournament at No. 233, she was also the lowest-ranked finalist on the WTA Tour since Justine Henin in 2010.
Vondroušová then won a $100k title at the Slovak Open back on the ITF Circuit the following month to enter the top 100 for the first time. This also made her the youngest player in the top 100 at the time.

Vondroušová made her Grand Slam championship debut at the French Open. She made it through qualifying and defeated Amandine Hesse in her first main draw match before losing to Daria Kasatkina. Vondroušová was directly accepted into the main draw at Wimbledon, losing her opening match. Later that month, she won another ITF title, the $80k Prague Open, to rise to No. 68 in the world. Nonetheless, she again lost her opening match at the US Open, despite pushing No. 8 Svetlana Kuznetsova to a third-set tiebreak. She ended her season after September.

2018–19: Teenage French Open finalist, world No. 14
Vondroušová had a slow start into the 2018 season, not winning multiple main-draw matches at any of her first five tournaments of the year, including the Australian Open. Nonetheless, she continued to rise in the rankings to as high as No. 50, after reaching the fourth round at the Indian Wells Open, where she defeated No. 11 Johanna Konta in the second round. Once Vondroušová did not defend the ranking points from her first title during the clay court season, her ranking began to drop. She won just two matches on clay and lost her opening round match at the French Open, causing her to fall outside the top 100. She also lost in the opening round at Wimbledon. Two weeks later, Vondroušová reached her first semifinal of the year at the Ladies Championship Gstaad. Nonetheless, she remained outside the top 100 by late August. As the last direct acceptance into the main draw of the US Open, Vondroušová produced her best result of the season. She upset No. 13 Kiki Bertens in the third round in a third-set tiebreak before losing in her next match. This result brought her back to No. 71 in the world. For the second consecutive year, she finished at No. 67, after ending her season in September.

Vondroušová had a strong start into the 2019 season. Although she lost in the second round of the Australian Open in singles, she reached semifinals in doubles with Barbora Strýcová where they lost a tight match to Samantha Stosur and Zhang Shuai. Vondroušová then reached the quarterfinals or better at each of her next six singles events. This streak included three finals appearances and began with a runner-up finish to defending champion Alison Van Uytvanck at the Hungarian Open. At the Indian Wells Open, Vondroušová upset No. 2 Simona Halep, the highest-ranked opponent she ever defeated. With quarterfinal appearances there and at the Miami Open, she returned to the top 50 for the first time in a little over a year. Vondroušová reached another final at the İstanbul Cup where she lost to No. 40, Petra Martić. She then defeated Halep again during her quarterfinal run at the Italian Open.

Vondroušová's best performance of the season came at the French Open, where she made it to the final without dropping a set. As an unseeded player, she defeated four seeded players including No. 12, Anastasija Sevastova in the fourth round and No. 26, Johanna Konta in the semifinals. She also defeated No. 31 Martić in the quarterfinals for the first time, after losing all four of their previous meetings. In the final, she lost to No. 8, Ashleigh Barty, only winning four games. Nonetheless, she became the first teenager to contest the French Open final since Ana Ivanovic in 2007 and the first to play in any Grand Slam final since Caroline Wozniacki at the 2009 US Open. She also entered top 20 for the first time. Despite this success, she lost in the opening round at Wimbledon to Madison Brengle, her last match of the year. After missing the next few months due to a left wrist injury suffered during that match, Vondroušová had surgery in September and stayed out for the rest of the season. She reached a peak ranking of No. 14 in the world during the season, and finished the year at No. 16.

2021: WTA 1000 doubles debut & first final, Olympic silver medallist
On her debut at the WTA 1000-level in doubles at the Italian Open, Vondroušová and partner Kristina Mladenovic reached the final, defeating second-seeded duo of Barbora Krejčíková and Kateřina Siniaková in the quarterfinals and wildcard pair Sara Errani and Irina-Camelia Begu in the semifinals. They lost their final to the alternate pair and WTA 1000-level first time winners, Giuliana Olmos and Sharon Fichman.

At the Tokyo Olympics, Vondroušová beat 16th seed Kiki Bertens, in the latter's final ever singles match on tour, and Mihaela Buzărnescu to reach the third round. There, she upset second seed and home favourite Naomi Osaka, beating her in straight sets to advance to the quarterfinals. There, she beat Paula Badosa (by retirement) to advance to the semifinals, where she scored her second top-ten win in the tournament by beating Elina Svitolina to reach the final and guarantee a medal. She lost to Belinda Bencic in three sets and won the silver medal.

2022: Third Indian Wells fourth round, surgery and early end of season
Seeded 21th at the 2022 BNP Paribas Open she defeated unseeded Naomi Osaka and Marie Bouzkova to reach the fourth round for the third time at this tournament.

2023: Consecutive Indian Wells fourth round
Using protected ranking, she reached the third rounds of the 2023 Australian Open defeating Alison Riske and second seed Ons Jabeur, and of the 2023 BNP Paribas Open defeating Rebecca Marino and 28th seed Marie Bouzková. In the latter she went one step further into the round of 16 for the fourth time at this WTA 1000 tournament defeating again fourth seed Ons Jabeur.

National representation

Fed Cup
Having won the Junior Fed Cup in 2015, Vondroušova made her senior Fed Cup debut for the Czech Republic in 2017 in their World Group semifinal tie against the United States. She lost her first match against CoCo Vandeweghe, but recovered to defeat Lauren Davis to set up a decisive doubles rubber. The Czech team lost the doubles match and was eliminated. Vondroušova returned to play in the Fed Cup in 2019 for the Czech team's World Group Play-off tie against Canada. She won two of the first three singles matches as the Czech Republic swept the tie to keep them in the World Group for 2020.

Olympics
She also represented her country in the 2020 Olympics, where she pulled off a shocking upset (6–1, 6–4) victory over home favorite Naomi Osaka in the third round of competition. She reached the final defeating Paula Badosa (by retirement) in the quarterfinals and fourth seed Elina Svitolina in the semifinals booking Czech Republic's first Olympic singles final. She lost to Belinda Bencic in three sets and was awarded the silver medal.

Playing style

Vondroušová's signature shot is the drop shot. In general, she has a crafty style of play and employs a wide variety of shots. She developed this type of playing style from working with one of her early coaches Jan Fuchs, who played the same way. Her game often includes long, strategic rallies in which she makes use of her left-handed topspin forehand. Aside from playing drop shots, Vondroušová has described her style of play as, "I'm just trying to play aggressive and maybe, like, mix the points, and I just want to serve well and move well." Her favorite surface is clay, the surface she grew up playing on. She also likes hard courts because of her playing style. Vondroušová excels in her return game more than her service game. In 2019, she led the WTA Tour in first serve points won on return among players with at least ten matches, winning 43.4 per cent of these points. She was also first in percentage of return games won and percentage of return points won overall.

Coaches
As a junior, Vondroušová was coached by Jan Fuchs starting from before the age of 12. Her stepfather Tomáš Anderle, who is a hockey coach, served as her physical fitness trainer. She was later coached by Zdeněk Kubík for three years. By 2015, she replaced Kubík with Jiří Hřebec and Dušan Karol. Hřebec is a former Czech professional player who reached a career-high ranking of No. 25 in the world on the ATP Tour. Vondroušová switched coaches from Hřebec to Martin Fassati in April 2018. After a lack of success with Fassati, she switched coaches again a few months later to Jan Hernych, another Czech former ATP professional player. She also later resumed working with Hřebec. Hernych serves as her only traveling coach since Hřebec does not travel to tournaments.

Career statistics

Grand Slam tournament performance timelines

Singles

Doubles

Source: WTA profile

Grand Slam tournament finals

Singles: 1 (runner-up)

Olympic finals

Singles: 1 (silver medal)

Personal life
On 16 July 2022, Vondroušová married her long time partner Štěpán Šimek. They had been engaged since the 2021 Tokyo Olympics, where Vondroušová won the silver medal.

Notes

References

External links
 
 
 

1999 births
Living people
People from Sokolov
Czech female tennis players
Australian Open (tennis) junior champions
French Open junior champions
Grand Slam (tennis) champions in girls' doubles
Tennis players at the 2014 Summer Youth Olympics
Olympic medalists in tennis
Olympic silver medalists for the Czech Republic
Medalists at the 2020 Summer Olympics
Tennis players at the 2020 Summer Olympics
Sportspeople from the Karlovy Vary Region